Colonel Arthur C. R. Waite MC., OSt.J., DL., JP., (1894–1991) was an Australian racing driver.

Born in Adelaide, Arthur Waite served at Gallipoli and was later hospitalised where he met his later wife, Irene Austin, who was the daughter of Herbert Austin. After World War I Colonel Waite joined his father-in-law's firm, the Austin Motor Company. While in the employ of Austin, Waite was sent back to Australia, where in Melbourne he established Austin Distributors. Prior to leaving for Australia he had established the firm's motor racing efforts, winning races himself at Brooklands and Monza.

While in Australia he sent for his Austin 7 racing car in order to compete in the 100 Miles Road Race, later to become known as the 1928 Australian Grand Prix. A different car was sent however, but despite it being a relatively standard sports model it was a supercharged for racing version of the Austin 7. Despite this, Waite won the Grand Prix (held at Phillip Island).

References

1894 births
1991 deaths
Australian military personnel of World War I
Brooklands people
Deputy Lieutenants
Grand Prix drivers
Officers of the Order of St John
Racing drivers from South Australia
Recipients of the Military Cross